USS John Blish was a Patrol Craft Sweeper (PCS) of the PCS-1376-Class, five of which were converted to small hydrographic survey vessels designated AGS and later coastal survey vessels, AGSc, that conducted hydrographic surveys for the United States Navy during and immediately after the Second World War. The small PCS type vessels assigned to the United States Navy Hydrographic Office missions conducted pre invasion surveys, sometimes under fire, with the survey crews erecting signals for survey and later navigation, laying buoys and placing lights.

Originally, PCS-1457 the survey vessel, conducted surveys supporting the Mariana Islands campaign, the landings at Iwo Jima the ship was renamed and redesignated John Blish (AGS-10) before conducting surveys supporting the landings at Okinawa. After the war John Blish was redesignated at a coastal survey ship, AGSc, conducting surveys off the United States West Coast until decommissioned at New York on 22 August 1949.

Construction and commissioning
PCS-1457, planned as PC-1457, was reclassified PCS in April 1943 and laid down by Ballard Marine Railway Company, Seattle, Washington on 23 May 1943. The vessel was launched on 6 September 1943 sponsored by Miss Patricia McQuire and on 26  February 1944  commissioned as USS PCS-1457 sailing for the Pacific war zone after shakedown and training.

The mission of the small survey vessels involved pre invasion surveys, sometimes under fire, with the survey crews erecting signals for survey and later erecting navigation, laying buoys and placing lights for further operations as well as conducting routine surveys of islands in fleet operating areas.

Pacific wartime operations
PCS-1457 supported the recapture of the Marianas, specifically Guam and Tinian landings with surveys before and after the invasion. After the Marianas operations the ship conducted general surveys in the Pacific until February 1945 when she conducted pre invasion surveys at Iwo Jima followed by surveys as the island was being secured. Charts resulting from surveys were printed on board  with a survey team from that ship erecting a reference navigational signal atop Mount Suribachi.

On 20 March 1945, PCS-1457 was reclassified as a Hydrographic Survey Ship (AGS-10) and four days later was renamed John Blish. The survey vessel continued more routine survey work until the invasion of Okinawa where she again supported landings with hydrographic work. The ship earned 4 battle stars for World War II  service.

Post war
John Blish was reclassified as a Coastal Surveying Ship (AGSC-10) on 27 July 1946 and conducted coastal surveys on the West Coast of the United States until sailing for New York and decommissioning on 22 August 1949. On 10 February 1950 she was sold to Boston Metals Company of Baltimore, Maryland for scrap.

Ship namesake
The survey vessel was named for Commander John Blish, USN (September 5, 1860 - December 22, 1921) who was appointed Cadet Midshipman 18 September 1875. From 1879–1901 he served the Navy both on the high seas and on various shore duty. On 5 October 1901 he was commissioned Lieutenant Commander then served until he retired 6 July 1905. Blish was appointed Commander on the retired list 13 April 1911. During World War I he served in the 1st Naval District as assistant to the Commandant, and commanded the Naval Air Station at Squantum, Mass. Comdr. Blish was detached 29 October 1919. In addition to his naval career, he invented the "Blish sounding tube" and the Blish lock, used in the Thompson submachine gun. John Blish died on 22 December 1921.

Footnotes

References

Bibliography

External links
 Derickson (AGS-6) Class: Photographs (Copy of old Naval History And Heritage Command photo page)
 NavSource Survey Ship (AGS) Index
 Navy Survey Ship (AGS) Designator Listing
 Blish Genealogy Ship Page

1943 ships
Ships built in Seattle
PCS-1376-class minesweepers
Survey ships of the United States Navy
World War II auxiliary ships of the United States